Raymond Christopher Daniel (born 10 December 1964) is an English former professional footballer. Born in Luton, he began his career with his hometown club Luton Town and later played for Gillingham, Hull City, Cardiff City, Portsmouth, Notts County and Walsall. He made over 250 appearances in The Football League between 1982 and 1997. He helped Portsmouth to the 1992 FA Cup semi final, but they lost in a penalty shoot-out to Liverpool.

References

External links
 

1964 births
Living people
Footballers from Luton
English footballers
Luton Town F.C. players
Gillingham F.C. players
Hull City A.F.C. players
Cardiff City F.C. players
Portsmouth F.C. players
Notts County F.C. players
Walsall F.C. players
Association football defenders